The Chinese Ambassador to Canada is the official representative of the People's Republic of China to Canada.

List of representatives

See also
 China–Canada relations

References 

 Ambassadors of China to Canada
Canada
China